is a subway station in Minato, Tokyo, Japan, operated by  the Tokyo subway operator Tokyo Metro.

Lines
Akasaka-mitsuke Station is served by the Tokyo Metro Ginza Line and Tokyo Metro Marunouchi Line, providing same-platform transfers between the two lines in the same direction (for example eastbound to eastbound). Reversing directions between the lines is also fairly easy as the eastbound lines are stacked above the westbound lines.

Station layout
The station has two island platforms serving four tracks. The Ginza Line and Marunouchi Line share platforms at this station.

History
The Ginza Line station opened on 18 November 1938. The Marunouchi Line station opened on 15 March 1959.

The station facilities were inherited by Tokyo Metro after the privatization of the Teito Rapid Transit Authority (TRTA) in 2004.

Surrounding area
 Akasaka and Nagatacho area
 Akasaka Palace
 Tōgū Palace
 Akasaka Prince Hotel
 Tokyo Garden Terrace
 Hotel New Otani
 Akasaka Excel Hotel Tokyu
 Sanno Park Tower
 Prudential Tower in Tokyo
 Hibiya High School
 Hie Shrine
 Suntory
 Kajima
 Toraya Confectionery
 Park Court Akasaka The Tower

See also
 List of railway stations in Japan

References

External links

  

Tokyo Metro Ginza Line
Tokyo Metro Marunouchi Line
Stations of Tokyo Metro
Railway stations in Tokyo
Railway stations in Japan opened in 1938